Jo Hye-ryung (born January 20, 1994), also known by her stage name Kisum, is a South Korean rapper and actress. In 2015, Kisum competed on the first season of the variety show Unpretty Rapstar. She had previously competed in season three of variety show, Show Me the Money 3.

Academic background 
 Seoul Jamdong Elementary School Graduation
 Jamsil Middle School Graduation
 Yeongpa Girls ' High School Graduation

Career 
Since August 2013, Kisum has appeared on a G bus TV broadcast on a bus in Gyeonggi Province. She is actually from Seoul, not Gyeonggi Province. In 2016 she starred in the Netflix television series My Runway.

Discography

Extended plays

Singles

Filmography

Television shows

References

External links
Kisum at Naver Cafe

1994 births
Living people
South Korean women rappers
South Korean television personalities
Unpretty Rapstar contestants
21st-century South Korean women singers
21st-century South Korean singers